Gary L. Thomas is a game designer who has worked primarily on role-playing games.

Career
Gary Thomas and Joe D. Fugate Sr. founded Digest Group Publications (DGP) together in 1986 as a business that they ran part-time while working as editors at other jobs. Fugate's work in The Traveller's Digest publication got the attention of Marc Miller at Game Designers' Workshop, who started a long-lasting working relationship between GDW and DGP by requesting Fugate and Thomas expand and revise the material which GDW then published as the last of the small black rulebooks for Traveller, Book 8: Robots (1986). Thomas wrote the first-ever MegaTraveller scenario, "Lion at Bay", which first appeared in issue #9 of The Traveller's Digest. Thomas later worked on material for TSR, the last of which was published in 1989-1991.

His D&D design work includes The Book of Lairs II (1987), Monstrous Compendium Volume 1 (1989), Monstrous Compendium Volume 2 (1989), Monstrous Compendium Forgotten Realms Appendix (1989), and The Shadow Elves (1990).

References

External links
 

Dungeons & Dragons game designers
Living people
Place of birth missing (living people)
Year of birth missing (living people)